Baeolidia variabilis is a species of sea slug, an aeolid nudibranch. It is a marine gastropod mollusc in the family Aeolidiidae found in the Philippines, the Marshall Islands and Papua New Guinea, central Indo-Pacific Ocean.

Etymology
The specific name variabilis refers to the variable colour forms of this species.

Distribution
The holotype of this species was collected under coral rubble in shallow water at Medio Island, Mindoro, Philippines, . Specimens from Papua New Guinea and Kwajalein Atoll, Marshall Islands were included in the description.

Description
There are apparently two colour forms of this species. The rhinophores are covered basally with sparse papillae which become numerous towards the tips. The cerata are rugose with opaque white pigment on the surface and translucent regions at the tips. In the Philippines animals the white pigment on the cerata was only in the basal and posterior regions of the cerata.

References

Aeolidiidae
Gastropods described in 2014